The 1998 Heineken Trophy was a tennis tournament played on grass courts in Rosmalen in the Netherlands that was part of the International Series of the 1998 ATP Tour and of Tier III of the 1998 WTA Tour. The tournament was held from June 15 through June 21, 1998.

Seeds
Champion seeds are indicated in bold text while text in italics indicates the round in which those seeds were eliminated.

Draw

Finals

References

Rosmalen Grass Court Championships
Doubles